Wang Randi (born 1991-05-31 in Dalian, Liaoning) is a female Chinese swimmer, who competed for Team China at the 2008 Summer Olympics.

Major achievements

2007 National Championships - 4th 50 m/5th 100 m breast;
2008 Short Course Worlds - 9th 50 m breast
2009 Asian Swimming Championships - 3rd 50m breast, 5th 100 breast

References
http://2008teamchina.olympic.cn/index.php/personview/personsen/5348

1991 births
Living people
Swimmers from Dalian
Olympic swimmers of China
Asian Games medalists in swimming
Swimmers at the 2010 Asian Games
Asian Games gold medalists for China
Medalists at the 2010 Asian Games
Swimmers at the 2008 Summer Olympics
Chinese female breaststroke swimmers
21st-century Chinese women